Carlos Pérez (born 18 August 1938) is a Nicaraguan weightlifter. He competed in the men's featherweight event at the 1968 Summer Olympics.

References

1938 births
Living people
Nicaraguan male weightlifters
Olympic weightlifters of Nicaragua
Weightlifters at the 1968 Summer Olympics
Sportspeople from Managua